The 1974 United States Senate election in Vermont took place on November 5, 1974. The incumbent Republican Senator, George Aiken, did not run for re-election to another term in the United States Senate. The Democratic nominee, attorney and prosecutor Patrick Leahy, defeated Republican nominee, then-Rep. Richard W. Mallary, to become Aiken's successor.

This election featured future Mayor of Burlington, U.S. Representative, and Leahy's future U.S. Senate colleague, Bernie Sanders, who was the nominee for the Liberty Union Party. Sanders won only 4.1% of the vote and failed to win any counties but managed to obtain 5.6% of the vote in Chittenden County, where the city of Burlington is located.

This election marked the first time in the state's history that Vermont elected a Democrat to the U.S. Senate, the last remaining U.S. state to do so. Leahy remained the only Democrat ever elected to the Senate in the state until 2022, when he retired and was replaced by Democrat Peter Welch. The last non-Republican elected to the Senate from Vermont at this point in time was Lawrence Brainerd, who was elected as a member of the Free Soil Party in 1854. Sanders would later be elected to Vermont's other U.S. Senate seat in 2006; he has caucused with the Democratic Party but serves as an independent.

Republican primary

Candidates
T. Serse Ambrosini, former Vice President of the Chase Manhattan Bank
Charles R. Ross, former member of the Burlington City Council and Professor of Economics at the University of Vermont
Richard W. Mallary, U.S. Representative from Vermont's at-large congressional district

Results

Democratic primary

Candidates
Nathaniel Frothingham, former teacher
Patrick Leahy, State Attorney for Chittenden County

Results

General election

Candidates
Patrick Leahy (D), State Attorney for Chittenden County
Richard W. Mallary (R), U.S. Representative from Vermont's at-large congressional district
Bernie Sanders (LU), carpenter and social worker

Results

See also
 1974 United States Senate elections

References

Vermont
1974
1974 Vermont elections
Bernie Sanders